Ann Sullivan (April 10, 1929 – April 13, 2020) was an American animator, who primarily worked for Disney Animation.

Early life and education 
Born Sara Ann McNeese in Fargo, North Dakota, to Thomas and Helen (Kossick) McNeese. Thomas was an accountant, and Helen was a stenographer. She went to a Catholic school and then to North Dakota State University.

She followed her sister to California and enrolled at the ArtCenter College of Design in Pasadena.

Career 
Upon graduating in the 1950s, she began working in the animation paint lab of Disney Studios on films, including Peter Pan. Later, she took a leave of absence to raise her four children. In 1973, she joined Hanna-Barbera.

Sullivan returned to Disney around 1987, animating such films as Oliver & Company (1988), The Little Mermaid (1989) and The Prince and the Pauper (1990). In the 1990s, she painted cels for  The Lion King (1994), Pocahontas (1995), Hercules (1997), Tarzan and Fantasia 2000 (both 1999). In the 2000s, she worked on The Emperor's New Groove (2000), Lilo & Stitch and Treasure Planet (both 2002).

Personal life 
In the early 1950s she married Kevin Sullivan. The couple had four children, and divorced in the 1970s. Sullivan was an avid painter. She taught art to children in the neighborhood of La Mirada, California where the family lived.

Retirement and death 
Sullivan spent her remaining years residing at the Motion Picture & Television Country House and Hospital, where she died of complications from COVID-19 on April 13, 2020, three days after her 91st birthday. She left behind four children, eight grandchildren and four great-grandchildren.

References

External links 
 

1929 births
2020 deaths
20th-century American women artists
21st-century American women artists
Animators from North Dakota
Art Center College of Design alumni
Deaths from the COVID-19 pandemic in California
People from Fargo, North Dakota
Hanna-Barbera people
Walt Disney Animation Studios people
American animators
American women animators